Eric Betts (27 June 1925 – 16 March 1990) was an English professional footballer who played as a winger. A journeyman throughout the 40s and 50s, Betts played for 10 different clubs throughout his career, 8 of which were in the English Football League.

References

1925 births
1990 deaths
Mansfield Town F.C. players
Coventry City F.C. players
Nuneaton Borough F.C. players
Walsall F.C. players
West Ham United F.C. players
Rochdale A.F.C. players
Crewe Alexandra F.C. players
Wrexham A.F.C. players
Oldham Athletic A.F.C. players
Bangor City F.C. players
English footballers
Association football wingers
English Football League players